Tyler Robert Armstrong (born January 22, 2004) is an American mountain climber who became the youngest person to climb Aconcagua in Argentina at the age of 9.

Mountaineering career

Beginning
Armstrong started his career as mountain climber at the age of 6 after watching a documentary about hiking. After finding out that the youngest person that ever climbed Mount Whitney was 9 years, Armstrong started to train every day and soon started to climb his first mountains.

Armstrong has hiked in ice, snow, rain, and heat. He has dealt with altitude sickness and hiking in the dark. Armstrong carries most of his own gear including poles, water, food, and clothing. His workout consists of running 4.5 miles on hills and walking an hour a day on a treadmill. He also hikes every month with his father.

Expeditions

Mount Whitney (July 26, 2011) – 14,495 feet

After months of training, Armstrong climbed Mount Whitney in a single day on July 26, 2011. At 7 years old, he might be the youngest boy to climb the mountain, with a 6-year old girl, Eva Luna Harper-Zahn, summiting in 2018.

 and later in 2019 Matthew and Arabella Adams (Twins aka Super Hiking Twins) at the age of 4 years 5 months old.  Also, in August, 2020, 7-year old girl Victoria Ibarra summited and completed the 22 mile roundtrip in one day. Starting at the base camp, his 11-mile hike to the top, with an elevation gain of more than 6000 feet, took him 7 hours and 50 minutes.

Mount Kilimanjaro (July 1, 2012) – 19,341 feet

Although Mount Kilimanjaro had a minimum age limit of 10 years old, Tyler obtained a special permit to climb to the top. He took the Lemosho Route, which took him eight days of climbing round trip. In those eight days, he hiked 48.5 miles and gained 10,644 feet of elevation. On July 1, 2012, Tyler was the second youngest person to reach the top at the age of 8.

Aconcagua (December 24, 2013) – 22,837 feet
After reaching the top of Kilimanjaro, Armstrong started to look for a new challenge, which he found in Argentina. Aconcagua was his new target, and being the youngest person to climb it was his goal. As a training exercise, he climbed Mount Baldy on August 17, 2013, as part of the fifth annual Climb to Cure Duchenne.
After months of preparation, Armstrong was ready for his journey to Argentina. On December 7, he left the United States. He spent his first couple of days trying to get a special permit because the minimum age for climbing Aconcagua is 14. After obtaining a special permit, Armstrong started his climb on December 15, taking the Polish Glacier Traverse Route. On December 24, 2013, Armstrong reached the top and broke the record for being the youngest person to climb Aconcagua, at the age of 9, making headlines all over the world.

Denali (June 2016) — 20,310 ft (6190 m)

At the age of 12, Tyler was denied a permit to climb Everest in the spring of 2016. Instead, he planned to climb Denali. In June 2016, he went to Denali and reached the summit with his dad.

Mountains climbed
Armstrong has climbed the following mountains:

 Cucamonga Peak (8,862 ft.)
 Denali (20,310 ft)
 Iron Mountain (8,007 ft.)
 Aconcagua (22,837 ft.) (At age 9, the youngest yet for this mountain)
 Mount Anderson (10,840 ft.)
 Mount Elbrus (18,510 ft.)
 Mount Islip (8,250 ft.)
 Mount Kilimanjaro (19,341 ft.) (at age 8)
 Mount Langley (14,026 ft.)
 Mount Lowe (5,603 ft.)
 Mount San Antonio (10,068 ft.)
 Mount San Bernardino East (10,691 ft.)
 Mount San Gorgonio (11,503 ft.)
 Mount San Jacinto (10,834 ft.)
 Mount Shields (10,680 ft.)
 Mount Whitney (14,495 ft.) (Summited in 1 day at age 7)
 Mount Wilson (5,710 ft.)

Records

Tyler has set the following records:

 July 26, 2011 – Mount Whitney in a single day, at the age of 7.
 July 1, 2012 – Second youngest person to climb Mount Kilimanjaro, at the age of 8. 
 December 24, 2013 – Youngest person to climb Mount Aconcagua, at the age of 9.

He has made efforts to summit Mount Everest, however he could not obtain a permit in 2016 and 2017.

Recognition

Tyler has been recognized for his climbs by:

 2011 – Named one of the “Best National Climbing Stories of 2011” by Examiner.com.
 July 17, 2012 – Certificate of Recognition by the Yorba Linda City Council for climbing Mount Kilimanjaro. 
 January 14, 2014 – Certificate of Congressional Recognition for climbing Mount Aconcagua. 
 February 4, 2014 – Certificate of Recognition by the Yorba Linda City Council for climbing Mount Aconcagua.

Duchenne muscular dystrophy awareness
When Armstrong was climbing Mount Whitney with his parents, he met a boy crippled by Duchenne muscular dystrophy.
Armstrong made it his goal to help find a cure for the disease and partnered with the CureDuchenne Foundation. By climbing mountains, he hopes to raise money and awareness for this disease. By the summer of 2016 he had raised 25,000 for this disease out of a goal of one million dollars (USD). Several hundred thousand people, mostly boys are afflicted by DMD, which is a fatal genetic disorder that typically cripples the afflicted by their teens and it is rare for them to make it to 30.

In addition to climbing he also hosted a special fund-raising movie presentation of Everest, with proceeds going to CureDuchenne foundation.

Book
Armstrong is featured in the book Stand Up!, an anthology featuring stories by 75 of the world’s most dynamic young activists who share their amazing experiences. Armstrong's story is called “Kilimanjaro for a Cause!” and it is in the Adventures Seekers chapter of the book.

Personal life
Armstrong lives in Yorba Linda, California, with his father Kevin, mother Priscilla, and brother Dylan. He likes playing his guitar, soccer, flag football, video games, swimming, laser tag and is a member of the Boy Scouts.

References

External links
 
 Official Facebook Page
 Official Youtube Channel

2004 births
Living people
American mountain climbers